Mozzarella is a southern Italian cheese traditionally made from Italian buffalo's milk by the pasta filata method.

Fresh mozzarella is generally white but when seasoned it turns to a light yellow depending on the animal's diet. Due to its high moisture content, it is traditionally served the day after it is made but can be kept in brine for up to a week or longer when sold in vacuum-sealed packages. Low-moisture mozzarella can be kept refrigerated for up to a month, though some shredded low-moisture mozzarella is sold with a shelf life of up to six months. Mozzarella is used for most types of pizza and several pasta dishes or served with sliced tomatoes and basil in Caprese salad.

Etymology
The term is first mentioned in 1570, cited in a cookbook by Bartolomeo Scappi, reading "milk cream, fresh butter, ricotta cheese, fresh mozzarella and milk". An earlier reference is also often cited as describing mozzarella. Monsignor Alicandri states that in the 12th century the Monastery of Saint Lorenzo, in Capua, Campania, offered pilgrims a piece of bread with "mozza".

Types
It is soaked in salt water (brine) or whey, and other times citric acid is added and it is partly dried (desiccated), its structure being more compact. In this last form it is often used to prepare dishes cooked in the oven, such as lasagna and pizza.

When twisted to form a plait, mozzarella is called . Mozzarella is also available in smoked and reduced-moisture, packaged varieties.

Ovolini refers to smaller-sized bocconcini, and sometimes to cherry bocconcini.

Variants

Several variants have been specifically formulated and prepared for use on pizza, such as low-moisture mozzarella cheese. The International Dictionary of Food and Cooking defines this cheese as "a soft spun-curd cheese similar to Mozzarella made from cow's milk" that is "[u]sed particularly for pizzas and [that] contains somewhat less water than real Mozzarella".

Low-moisture part-skim mozzarella, widely used in the food service industry, has a low galactose content, per some consumers' preference for cheese on pizza to have low or moderate browning. Some pizza cheeses derived from skim mozzarella variants were designed not to require aging or the use of starter. Others can be made through the direct acidification of milk.

Buffalo's milk
In Italy, the cheese is produced nationwide using Italian buffalo's milk under the government's official name Mozzarella di latte di bufala because Italian buffalo are present in all Italian regions. Only selected Mozzarella di bufala campana PDO is a type, made from the milk of Italian buffalo raised in designated areas of Campania, Lazio, Apulia, and Molise. Unlike other mozzarellas—50% of whose production derives from non-Italian and often semi-coagulated milk—it holds the status of a protected designation of origin (PDO 1996) under European Union law and UK law.

Cow's milk
Fior di latte is made from fresh pasteurized or unpasteurized cow's milk and not water buffalo milk, which greatly lowers its cost. Outside the EU, "mozzarella" not clearly labeled as deriving from water buffalo can be presumed to derive from cow milk. Mozzarella affumicata means smoked mozzarella.

Ciliegine is a traditional Italian type of mozzarella which consists of small smooth white balls of mozzarella that are made with pasteurized cow's milk, or sometimes with water buffalo's milk. They are slightly smaller than bocconcini, another type of mozzarella balls that can often be used interchangeably with ciliegine.

Sheep's milk
Mozzarella of sheep milk, sometimes called "mozzarella pecorella", is typical of Sardinia, Abruzzo, and Lazio, where it is also called 'mozzapecora'. It is worked with the addition of the rennet of lamb.

Goat's milk
Mozzarella of goat's milk is of recent origin and the producers are still few.

Production

Mozzarella di bufala is traditionally produced solely from the milk of the Italian Mediterranean buffalo. A whey starter is added from the previous batch that contains thermophilic bacteria, and the milk is left to ripen so the bacteria can multiply. Then, rennet is added to coagulate the milk. After coagulation, the curd is cut into large, 2.5 – 5 cm pieces, and left to sit so the curds firm up in a process known as healing.

After the curd heals, it is further cut into 1 – 1.5 cm large pieces. The curds are stirred and heated to separate the curds from the whey. The whey is then drained from the curds and the curds are placed in a hoop to form a solid mass. The curd mass is left until the pH is at around 5.2–5.5, which is the point when the cheese can be stretched and kneaded to produce a delicate consistency—this process is generally known as pasta filata. According to the Mozzarella di Bufala trade association, "The cheese-maker kneads it with his hands, like a baker making bread, until he obtains a smooth, shiny paste, a strand of which he pulls out and lops off, forming the individual mozzarella." It is then typically formed into cylinder shapes or in plait. In Italy, a "rubbery" consistency is generally considered not satisfactory; the cheese is expected to be softer.

Recognitions and regulations
Mozzarella received a Traditional Specialities Guaranteed (TSG) certification from the European Union in 1998. This protection scheme requires that mozzarella sold in the European Union is produced according to a traditional recipe. The TSG certification does not specify the source of the milk, so any type of milk can be used, but it is speculated that it is normally made from whole milk.

Different variants of this dairy product are included in the list of traditional Italian agri-food products (P.A.T) of the Ministry of Agricultural, Food and Forestry Policies (MIPAAF), with the following denominations:
 Mozzarella (Basilicata)
 Silana mozzarella (Calabria)
 Mozzarella della mortella (Campania)
 Mozzarella di Brugnato (Liguria)
 Cow's mozzarella (Molise)
 Mozzarella or fior di latte (Apulia)
 Mozzarella (Sicily).

Around the world 
Çaycuma mozzarella cheese and Kandıra mozzarella cheese are Turkish cheeses made of buffalo's milk.

See also

 Burrata
 List of cheeses
 List of Italian products with protected designation of origin
 List of smoked foods
 List of stretch-cured cheeses
 List of water buffalo cheeses
 Mozzarella sticks
 Pizza
 String cheese
 Stracciatella di bufala

Explanatory notes

References

External links

Bocconcini Information; Ingredients & Nutritional Info, Recipes, FAQ & More.
Video How Mozzarella Cheese is Manufactured
Step-by-step photo guide to making Mozzarella
Mozzarella di Bufala Campana trade organization
The official DOP Consortium site – (Requires Flash)
Sito di approndimento scientifico sulla mozzarella, e l'allevamento di bufala campana

Cow's-milk cheeses
Italian cheeses
Smoked cheeses
Stretched-curd cheeses
Traditional Speciality Guaranteed products from Italy
Water buffalo's-milk cheeses